The South East Counties Women's League is an association football league in England. The competition covers the counties of Kent, Surrey, and Sussex. Founded by the Women's Football Association in 1990 from the Sussex Martlet Women's League with around 20 clubs, the South East Counties Women's League became part of the pyramid structure in 1998 following the founding of the South East Combination Women's Football League.

The league is at levels 7 to 9 of the women's pyramid. It promotes to the London and South East Women's Regional Football League, and does not relegate to any league.

Between the seasons 1998–99 and 2009–10, the South East Counties Premier Division sat at level 5 in the pyramid, and at level 6 between seasons 2010–11 and 2019–20. The Premier Division appeared to be discontinued in 2020–21 and replaced at level 6 by extra divisions in the London and South East League, Division 1 North and South.

Teams
The teams competing during the 2021–22 season were:

References

External links
 South East Counties Womens League: The FA Full-Time
 SECWFL official website

6
Football leagues in Kent
Football in Surrey
Football in Sussex